La ambiciosa, is a Mexican telenovela that aired on  Canal 4, Telesistema Mexicano in 1960. Directed by Raúl Astor and starring Kitty de Hoyos.

Cast 
 Kitty de Hoyos
 Carlos Cores
 Silvia Suárez
 Antonio de Hud
 José Baviera
 José Suárez

Production 
Original Story: Raúl Astor
Director: Raúl Astor

References 

1960 telenovelas
Mexican telenovelas
Televisa telenovelas
Television shows set in Mexico City
1960 Mexican television series debuts
1960 Mexican television series endings
Spanish-language telenovelas